Dascylium or Daskylion  or Daskyleion (Δασκυλεῖον) was a town of ancient Bithynia, mentioned by Stephanus of Byzantium.

Its site is located near Eşkel, Asiatic Turkey.

References

Populated places in Bithynia
Former populated places in Turkey